Disney's Mediterranean Resort was a proposed Disney Deluxe resort to be located at Walt Disney World in Lake Buena Vista, Florida that originally would have begun operation in the late 1990s.  It was going to be themed after a small Greek island and be located on Seven Seas Lagoon. Land was cleared for the building, but due to very swampy and poor ground samples, the resort was never able to be built. The resort was to be a 5 star resort rivaling Disney's Grand Floridian Resort & Spa, also on the lagoon.

The resort would have been located between the Transportation and Ticket Center and Disney's Contemporary Resort near the aqueduct. It was originally intended that an earlier un-built resort, Disney's Venetian Resort, would have opened on the same site in 1974.

On April 28, 2010, it was discovered that a portion of the land where the Mediterranean Resort was to have been constructed was cleared once again. The land was cleared for the purpose of improving lines of sight for the Walt Disney World Monorail System.

Resort facts
Category: Deluxe
Theme: Mediterranean / Greek
Location: Magic Kingdom Resort Area
Original Opening Date: Early 1990s (never built)

See also
 Disney's Venetian Resort

References

 

 
 http://www.insidethemagic.net/2017/07/d23-expo-2017-new-disney-riviera-resort-hotel-announced-walt-disney-world-connect-disney-skyliner/
 http://www.prnewswire.com/news-releases/disney-vacation-club-announces-next-planned-development-disney-riviera-resort-300488813.html

Mediterranean Resort